"Gefühle" ("Feelings") is a song by German singer Yvonne Catterfeld, recorded for her debut studio album Meine Welt (2003). It was written by Klaus Hirschburger, Mirko von Schlieffen, Achim Jannsen, and Manfred Thiers, while production was helmed by von Schlieffen, Jannsen, and Thiers. A mid-tempo ballad, the song was selected as the third single to be lifted from Meine Welt (2003).

The music video for "Gefühle" was directed by Thomas Job.

Formats and track listings

Charts

Weekly charts

References

External links
 YvonneCatterfeld.com — official website

2002 singles
2002 songs
Yvonne Catterfeld songs
Songs written by Klaus Hirschburger